Stanisław Makowiejew (born 17 May 1991) is a Polish handball player for Energa MKS Kalisz and the Polish national team.

References

1991 births
Living people
Polish male handball players
People from Tiraspol